The TNA 2006 World X Cup Tournament was a professional wrestling X Cup Tournament staged by Total Nonstop Action Wrestling in April and May 2006. The tournament pits stables of X Division-style wrestlers from around the world against one another in a series of singles and tag team matches, with the teams earning points for victories.

Team USA won the World X Cup for the second time in a row after team captain Chris Sabin defeated Team Canada captain Petey Williams to break a 5-5 tie on the May 18, 2006 edition of TNA Impact!. This is Chris Sabin's second World X Cup Championship, as he was a member of Team USA in 2004.

Several matches leading up to the World X Cup were billed as "World X Cup preview matches", including a six-man tag team match between members of Team USA and Team Japan at Lockdown, in which Team Japan were victorious; and the aforementioned four-way match at Destination X, featuring Chris Sabin, Petey Williams, Puma and Sonjay Dutt, representing the United States, Canada, Japan and India respectively (Puma and Dutt would go on to compete for Mexico and the US).

History 
The 2004 World X Cup took place in May 2004, with Team USA defeating Team Canada, Team Japan, Team Mexico, and Team Britain. In October 2005, TNA website manager Bill Banks announced that, as a result of the working relationship between TNA and the Japanese New Japan Pro-Wrestling promotion, TNA were considering hosting a second World X Cup, this time featuring members of the NJPW roster.

On the February 18, 2006 episode of TNA Impact!, it was announced that the World X Cup was to return in 2006. Later that evening, Jay Lethal defeated "The Prince of Punk" Shannon Moore and Roderick Strong in a three-way match to become the first member of the 2006 Team USA. On the March 11, 2006 episode of Impact!, Chris Sabin became the second member of Team USA when he defeated Sonjay Dutt and Alex Shelley in another three-way match. On the March 18, 2006 episode of Impact!, Sonjay Dutt defeated Maverick Matt and Elix Skipper in a third three-way match to become the third member of Team USA. On the April 8, 2006 episode of Impact!, Alex Shelley defeated Roderick Strong and Chase Stevens to become the fourth and final member of Team USA.

Team Mexico and Team Japan were quickly announced as competitors in the 2006 World X Cup, much like they were in the 2004 World X Cup. Team UK was planned, but they were replaced by Team Canada, after two of the members, Doug Williams and Nigel McGuinness were already booked to wrestle in Japan. The other members were to be Jonny Storm and Jody Fleisch.

Rules 
The competition is divided into three rounds.
In Round One, there are two tag team matches. The two winning teams get two points apiece.
In Round Two, there are two singles matches. The winners get three points for their respective teams.
In Round Three, there will be a gauntlet involving all 16 wrestlers. The last two remaining wrestlers receive two points apiece for their respective teams. The winner gets an additional three points for his team. If the final two are on the same team, then they will automatically receive all seven points, and thus win the tournament.
In the event of a tie, the captains of the two teams will compete in a singles match in order to determine the champion.

Teams and Members 

Team TNA
 Chris Sabin (Captain)
 Jay Lethal
 Sonjay Dutt
 Alex Shelley

Team Canada
 Petey Williams (Captain)
 Eric Young
 Johnny Devine
 Tyson Dux

Team Mexico
 Shocker (Captain)
 Puma
 Magno
 Incognito

Team Japan
 Jushin Thunder Liger (Captain)
 Hirooki Goto
 Minoru Tanaka
 Black Tiger

Results

Round One (Tag Team Matches) - 1 Point
TNA Impact!: April 27, 2006
 Team USA (Sonjay Dutt and Alex Shelley) defeated  Team Japan (Hirooki Goto and Minoru)
''TNA Impact!: May 4, 2006 Team Mexico (Shocker and Magno) defeated  Team Canada (Eric Young and Johnny Devine)

Round 2 (Singles Matches) - 2 Points TNA Impact!:May 11, 2006 Team USA's Chris Sabin defeated  Team Mexico's PumaTNA Sacrifice: May 14, 2006 Team Japan's Jushin Thunder Liger defeated  Team Canada's Petey Williams

 Round 3 (The Gauntlet) - 5 Points TNA Sacrifice: May 14, 200616-man Gauntlet:  Team Canada's Petey Williams won, last eliminating  Team Mexico's Puma
Team Mexico gained three points for coming in second, Team USA gained two points for coming in third, and Team Japan gained one point for coming in fourth.

Entry and elimination order
The order of entry in the gauntlet match included a pattern: Japan, Mexico, Canada, USA. This is identical to the final standings in reverse.

Round Four (Tie-breaker) - 1 Point TNA Impact!'': May 18, 2006
 Team USA's Chris Sabin defeated  Team Canada's Petey Williams

Standings
The standings for the 2004 and 2006 World X Cups were identical; in both, Team USA was ranked first, Canada second, Mexico third and Japan fourth.

 Team USA: 6
 Team Canada: 5
 Team Mexico: 4
 Team Japan: 3

References

TNA News And Views In The New Bank Shot (October 30, 2005)

External links 
TNAWrestling.com (Official Website of TNA Wrestling)

2006 World X Cup Tournament, TNA
2006 in professional wrestling